Kelly Perlette is a Canadian boxer, who fought southpaw.  He was the 1978 Commonwealth Games Light Middle Weight Gold Medal Champion.  He was unable to compete in the 1980 Olympics because of Canada's decision to boycott the games.  He grew up in Spruce Grove and is a member of the Spruce Grove Hall of Fame.  He currently resides in Edmonton, Alberta.

Sources 
http://www.boxrec.com/list_bouts.php?human_id=84106&cat=boxer
http://www.sprucegrove.org/Residents/Community_Information/Spruce_Grove_-_Awards_of_Excellence/Inductees/2007_Inductees.htm

Year of birth missing (living people)
Living people
People from Spruce Grove
Light-middleweight boxers
Sportspeople from Alberta
Boxers at the 1978 Commonwealth Games
Commonwealth Games gold medallists for Canada
Canadian male boxers
Commonwealth Games medallists in boxing
Medallists at the 1978 Commonwealth Games